Danijel Jumić (born 27 June 1986) is a Croatian football coach and former player who most recently the manager of Prva HNL club Istra 1961.

He played for Vllaznia Shkodër in the Albanian Superliga in 2010.

He was appointed Academy manager at NK Osijek in June 2021 after leaving NK Istra 1961.

Managerial statistics

References 

1986 births
Living people
Footballers from Osijek
Association football forwards
Croatian footballers
Croatia youth international footballers
FC Koper players
FC Kärnten players
SV Spittal players
NK Jadran Poreč players
FC DAC 1904 Dunajská Streda players
NK Novigrad players
KF Vllaznia Shkodër players
Slovenian PrvaLiga players
Slovak Super Liga players
Kategoria Superiore players
Croatian expatriate footballers
Expatriate footballers in Slovenia
Croatian expatriate sportspeople in Slovenia
Expatriate footballers in Austria
Croatian expatriate sportspeople in Austria
Expatriate footballers in Slovakia
Croatian expatriate sportspeople in Slovakia
Expatriate footballers in Albania
Croatian expatriate sportspeople in Albania
Croatian football managers
NK Istra 1961 managers